Light Table is an integrated development environment for software engineering developed by Chris Granger and Robert Attorri. It features real-time feedback allowing instant execution, debugging and access to documentation. The instant feedback provides an execution environment intended to help developing abstractions.

The development team attempted to create a program which shows the programmer what the effects of their additions are in real-time, rather than requiring them to work out the effects as they write the code. Though the program began by supporting only Clojure, it has since aimed to support Python and JavaScript. The developers claim that the software can reduce programming time by up to 20%.

It was financed by a Kickstarter fundraising campaign and subsequently backed by Y Combinator. The Kickstarter campaign aimed to raise $200,000 USD and finished with $316,720 USD.

See also 
Interactive programming
Literate programming

Notes

References 

Formerly proprietary software
Free integrated development environments
Free integrated development environments for Python
Free text editors
HTML editors
Linux text editors
MacOS text editors
Software using the MIT license
Unix text editors
Windows text editors